Thomas Mace (1612 or 1613 – c. 1706) was an English lutenist, viol player, singer, composer and musical theorist of the Baroque era. His book Musick's Monument (1676) provides a valuable description of 17th century musical practice.

Biography

Born in 1612 or 1613, he played the lute from c. 1621, but his teacher if any is unknown. He also played the viol. He was a singer, termed a lay clerk, in the choir of Trinity College, Cambridge from 1635 until his death.

During the 1644 Siege of York, in the English Civil War, he was present in that city, where he had family.

He died c. 1706.

Works
In 1676 he published Musick's Monument, for about 300 subscribers. The title page described it as:

Its large section on the lute contained a comprehensive lute tutorial and guide to the instrument, and there was a similar, smaller section on the viol. The book also contained some metaphysical speculation regarding the significance of musical ratios such as the octave.

John Hawkins in A General History Of The Science and Practice Of Music (1776) commented:

Notes

References

External links

1610s births
Place of birth missing
1700s deaths
Place of death missing
English classical composers
English Baroque composers
Composers for lute
English lutenists
English viol players
English singers
English music theorists
17th-century English musicians
17th-century classical composers
People associated with the University of Cambridge
Trinity College, Cambridge
English male classical composers
17th-century male musicians